In mathematics, Schwartz space  is the function space of all functions whose derivatives are rapidly decreasing. This space has the important property that the Fourier transform is an automorphism on this space. A function in the Schwartz space is sometimes called a Schwartz function.

Schwartz space is named after French mathematician Laurent Schwartz.

Definition

Let  be the set of non-negative integers, and for any , let  be the n-fold Cartesian product.

In particular, is a subspace of the function space of smooth functions from  into .

Examples of functions in the Schwartz space
 If α is a multi-index, and a is a positive real number, then

 Any smooth function f with compact support is in S(Rn). This is clear since any derivative of f is continuous and supported in the support of f, so (xαDβ) f has a maximum in Rn by the extreme value theorem.
 Because the Schwartz space is a vector space, any polynomial  can by multiplied by a factor  for  a real constant, to give an element of the Schwartz space. In particular, there is an embedding of polynomials inside a Schwartz space.

Properties

Analytic properties 

 From Leibniz's rule, it follows that  is also closed under pointwise multiplication:
 If  then the product .
 The Fourier transform is a linear isomorphism .
 is a distinguished locally convex Fréchet Schwartz TVS over the complex numbers.
 Both  and its strong dual space are also:
complete Hausdorff locally convex spaces,
nuclear Montel spaces,
It is known that in the dual space of any Montel space, a sequence converges in the strong dual topology if and only if it converges in the weak* topology,
Ultrabornological spaces,
reflexive barrelled Mackey spaces.

Relation of Schwartz spaces with other topological vector spaces 

If , then .

See also
 Bump function
 Schwartz–Bruhat function
 Nuclear space

References

Sources

 

Topological vector spaces
Smooth functions
Fourier analysis
Function spaces
Schwartz distributions